Bema neuricella is a species of snout moth in the genus Bema. It was described by Zeller in 1848, and is known from St. Thomas, Hispaniola, Cuba and the Bahamas. It is also found in North America, including Iowa and Florida.

References

Phycitinae
Moths described in 1848